The Nicaraguan Armed Forces are the military forces of Nicaragua. There are three branches: the Navy, the Army, and Air Force.

History

National Guard, 1925–1979

The long years of strife between the liberal and conservative political factions and the existence of private armies led the United States to sponsor the National Guard as an apolitical institution to assume all military and police functions in Nicaragua. The marines provided the training, but their efforts were complicated by a guerrilla movement led by Augusto César Sandino. Sandino opposed the United States-backed military force, which was composed mostly of his political enemies, and continued to resist the marines and the fledgling National Guard from a stronghold in the mountainous areas of northern Nicaragua.

Upon the advent of the United States Good Neighbor Policy in 1933, the marines withdrew. Having reached a strength of about 3,000 by the mid-1930s, the guard was organized into company units, although the Presidential Guard component approached battalion size. Despite hopes for an apolitical force, however, the National Guard soon became the personal tool of the Somoza dynasty. Expanded to more than 10,000 during the civil war of 1978–79, the guard consisted of a reinforced battalion as its primary tactical unit, a Presidential Guard battalion, a mechanized company, an engineer battalion, artillery and antiaircraft batteries, and one security company in each of the country's sixteen departments.

The National Guard's main arms were rifles and machine guns, later augmented by antiaircraft guns and mortars. Although Nicaragua was not actively involved in World War II, it qualified for United States Lend-Lease military aid in exchange for U.S. base facilities at Corinto. Additional shipments of small arms and transportation and communication equipment followed, as well as some training and light transport aircraft.

United States military aid to the National Guard continued under the Rio de Janeiro Treaty of Mutual Defense (1947), but stopped in 1976 after relations with the administration of Anastasio Somoza Debayle (1967–72, 1974–79) worsened. Some United States equipment of World War II vintage was also purchased from other countries—Staghound armored cars and M4 Sherman medium tanks from Israel and F-51 Mustang fighter aircraft from Sweden. Except for minor frontier skirmishes with Honduras in 1957 over a border dispute, the National Guard was not involved in any conflict with its neighbors. The guard's domestic power, however, gradually broadened to embrace not only its original internal security and police functions but also control over customs, telecommunications, port facilities, radio broadcasting, the merchant marine, and civil aviation.

Military under the Sandinista government, 1979–1990
 
To replace the National Guard, the Sandinistas established a new national army, the Sandinista Popular Army (Ejército Popular Sandinista—EPS), and a police force, the Sandinista Police (Policía Sandinista). These two groups, contrary to the original Puntarenas Pact were controlled by the Sandinistas and trained by personnel from Cuba, Eastern Europe, and the Soviet Union. Opposition to the overwhelming FSLN influence in the security forces did not surface until 1980.

Meanwhile, the EPS developed, with support from Cuba and the Soviet Union, into the largest and best equipped military force in Central America. Simultaneously, with the introduction of Patriotic Military Service (1983), a conscription system, EPS forces reached approximately 80,000 active-duty members by 1990. Patriotic Military Service required males, ranging in age from seventeen to twenty-six, to serve four years in the military (two years active duty and two years in the reserves). This conscription system did not require women to enlist; however, they could do so voluntarily.

The Patriotic Military Service system was an extremely unpopular initiative taken by the Sandinista government. Draft dodging was rampant as young men fled the country in order to avoid conscription. Additionally, massive demonstrations and antidraft protests plagued the country. The unpopularity of the draft was believed to have been a large factor in the Sandinista election defeat in 1990.

Armed Forces performed very well in terms of human rights under the Sandinistas. Upon visiting Nicaragua, human rights organizations such as Amnesty International, Americas Watch, and the Human Rights Commission of the Organization of American States found “little evidence of the extreme types of human rights violations so common under…US-backed regimes.” These organizations were also unable to find any examples of: state-sponsored death squads, use of physical torture propagated by the state, and very few disappearances/executions. Although, the investigations led by human rights organizations excluded unruly soldiers acting violently on their own accord. In this context, it was discovered that the government's “usual response…was to investigate and discipline those responsible.”

Nicaraguan Armed Forces, 1990–1995
Under an agreement between President-elect Chamorro of the National Opposition Union (Unión Nacional Oppositora – UNO) and the defeated FSLN party, General Humberto Ortega, former defense minister and commander in chief of the EPS under the Sandinistas, remained at the head of the armed forces. By a law that took effect in April 1990, the EPS became subordinate to President Chamorro as commander in chief. Chamorro also retained the Ministry of Defense portfolio.

Chamorro's authority over the EPS was very limited. There were no Ministry of Defense offices and no vice ministers to shape national defense policies or exercise civilian control over the armed forces. Under the Law of Military Organization of the Sandinista Popular Army enacted just before Chamorro's election victory, Humberto Ortega retained authority over promotions, military construction, and force deployments. He contracted for weapons procurement and drafted the military budget presented to the government. Only an overall budget had to be submitted to the legislature, thus avoiding a line-item review by the National Assembly.

Sandinista officers remained at the head of all general staff directorates and military regions. The chief of the army, Major General Joaquín Cuadra Lacayo, continued in his pre-Chamorro position. Facing domestic pressure to remove Humberto Ortega and the risk of curtailment of United States aid as long as Sandinistas remained in control of the armed forces, Chamorro announced that Ortega would be replaced in 1994. Ortega challenged her authority to relieve him and reiterated his intention to remain at the head of the EPS until the army reform program was completed in 1997. This date was later advanced to the first half of 1995.

The army reform measures were launched with deep cuts in personnel strengths, the abolition of conscription, and disbanding of the militia. The size of the army declined from a peak strength of 97,000 troops to an estimated 15,200 in 1993, accomplished by voluntary discharges and forced retirements. Under the Sandinistas, the army general staff embodied numerous branches and directorates artillery, combat readiness, communications, Frontier Guards, military construction, intelligence, counterintelligence, training, operations, organization and mobilization, personnel, and logistics. Most of these bodies appear to have been retained, although they have been trimmed and reorganized. The Nicaraguan Air Force and Navy were also subordinate to the army general staff.

Since 1990 the mission of the EPS has been to ensure the security of the national borders and to deal with internal disturbances. Its primary task has been to prevent disorder and violence wrought by armed bands of former Contra and Sandinista soldiers.

In November and December 1992, the EPS was deployed alongside the National Police to prevent violence during demonstrations by the National Workers' Front for improved pay and benefits. The EPS and the Frontier Guards also assist the police in narcotics control. A small EPS contingent works alongside demobilized Contras in a Special Disarmament Brigade to reduce the arsenal of weapons in civilian hands.

National Army of Nicaragua, 1995–2006
In 1995, the National Army of Nicaragua (Ejército de Nicaragua), having never previously been fully apolitical evolved, through constitutional reforms, into a more traditional Central American military. As ties to the FSLN weakened, military leaders turned over power regularly without “fuss,” refrained from becoming involved in the political realm, and the overall size of the military significantly decreased.

National Army of Nicaragua, 2006–present 
Under President Ortega, multiple changes have occurred strengthening FSLN control over the national military. During 2010, the national assembly “passed changes that allowed [the] politicization of the country’s security forces, while expanding these agencies’ domestic powers.” This change effectively erased the shift towards being an apolitical force from 1995 to 2006. Then in 2014, President Ortega supported a constitutional reform removing the defense and governance ministries “from the security forces’ chain of command, reducing oversight and leaving [President] Ortega in charge of appointing military and police commanders.” This action enhanced President Ortega’s political and personal control over the nation’s security forces and personnel.

President Ortega has also strengthened his ability to control the general population through two different national security initiatives. In 2015, the Sovereign Security Law, “erased barriers between internal and external security, and gave the Ortega government wide discretion to use coercion against any person or entity deemed a threat to the state, society, or economy.” The Sovereign Security Law provided the Ortega administration the right to infringe upon the basic human rights protected in the Nicaraguan constitution, if deemed necessary. Also, CPCs “have been replaced by Family, Community, and Life Cabinets (Gabinetes).” These cabinets are linked to the police and provide the government with a means to keep communities under constant surveillance.

In the contemporary period, multiple changes have taken place in the military regarding purpose and structure. The military currently serves as a force for national defense, public security, civil defense, and national development. In 2014, an expansion of institutional powers granted the military with the opportunity for greater involvement in international security initiatives. The National Army of Nicaragua also has the highest public approval ratings of any Nicaraguan institution.

Army equipment

Light equipment

	
 Degtyaryov machine gun
 Makarov PM
 M1911 pistol
 Smith & Wesson Model 10
 Browning Hi-Power
 Glock 17
 Jericho 941
 Heckler & Koch MP5
 PPSh-41
 IMI Uzi
 IMI Mini Uzi
 FN FAL
 Heckler & Koch G3
 AK-74MS
 Type 58 rifle
 Type 56 assault rifle
 Pistol Mitralieră model 1963/1965
 Romanian RPK version of the MD. 63 is called the MD. 64
 Pistol Mitralieră model 1990
 Puşcă Mitralieră model 1964 ("model 1964 light machine gun")
 AIM/AIMS
 AIM - 7.62×39mm
 PM.md.65 with cleaning rod removed – 7.62×39mm. An early version of the AIMS with an under folding stock and inward curved grip
 AIMS - 7.62×39mm
 AIMS with 75-round drum magazine - 7.62×39mm
 AIMR
 First model AIMR with 20-round magazine – 7.62×39mm. The original Romanian designation for this rifle is the PM md. 80
 AIMR – 7.62×39mm. The original Romanian designation for this rifle is the PM md. 90 cu țeavă scurtă (short barrelled)
 AIMR – 5.56×45mm. The original Romanian designation for this rifle is the PA md. 97 cu țeavă scurtă (short barrelled)
 AIMR – 5.56×45mm. The original Romanian designation for this rifle is the PA md. 97 cu țeavă scurtă (short barrelled)
 Romanian AK Draco Pistol - 7.62×39mm. This is a US import variant of the AIMR and can be identified by its lack of a stock, a plain hand guard without palmswell and 2 position selector switch
 Romanian AK Draco Carbine - 7.62×39mm. This is a Draco pistol fitted with an AIMS folding stock to replicate the original AIMR, however it still lacks the palmswell hand guard and 3 position selector switch
 PM md. 80 Pistol Mitralieră model 1980
 PM md. 90Pistol Mitralieră model 1990
 AK-103 Used by Nicaraguan Special Forces.
 AK-47
 Type I AK-47, hybrid stamped/milled receiver with prototype slab sided magazine - 7.62×39mm
 Type II AK-47 (note stock mounting bracket) with prototype slab sided magazine - 7.62×39mm
 Type II AK-47 - 7.62×39mm
 Type III AK-47 with prototype slab-sided magazine - 7.62×39mm
 AKM
 AKMS / MPiKMS
 AKMSK
 Zastava M70
Zastava M-70A – milled receiver, underfolding stock
M-70A1 – milled receiver, underfolding stock, mount for night or optical sights
M-70B1 – stamped receiver, fixed stock
M-70AB2 – stamped receiver, underfolding stock
M-70B1N – stamped receiver, fixed stock, mount for night or optical sights
M-70AB2N – stamped receiver, underfolding stock, mount for night or optical sights
M-70AB3 – stamped receiver, underfolding stock, rifle grenade sight removed and replaced with a BGP 40mm underslung grenade launcher
M-70B3 – stamped receiver, fixed stock, rifle grenade sight removed and replaced with a BGP 40mm underslung grenade launcher
M-92 –  carbine, the shorter variant of the M-70AB2
PAP M-70 – semi-automatic variant intended for the civilian market
 MPi-KM/MPi-KMS-72
 MPi-KMS
 East German MPi-KM-72 with fixed stock – 7.62×39mm. This was the transitional MPi-KM-72 that still used the wooden lower hand grip from the MPi-KM. These were common from 1965 to 1972. The Side folding stock was not widely distributed until 1973
 East German MPi-KM with plastic stock – 7.62×39mm
 East German MPi-KMS-72 with sling and side-folding stock – 7.62×39mm
M-92 –  carbine, the shorter variant of the M-70AB2
PAP M-70 – semi-automatic variant intended for the civilian market
 AK-74 – Assault rifle
 AKS-74 – Side-folding stock
 AK-74N (AKS-74N) – Night scope rail
 AKS-74U – Compact carbine
 AKS-74UN – Night scope rail
 AK-63
 AK-63F (AMM in Hungarian service): The basic fixed-stock copy of the Soviet AKM.
 AK-63D (AMMSZ in Hungarian service): An AKMS copy with an under-folding steel stock.
 AK-63MF: Modernised AK-63D with telescopic stock and MIL-STD-1913 Picatinny rail.
 SA-85M: A semi-automatic-only version intended for civilian sales in the United States; imported by Kassnar in both pre- and post-ban versions.
 IMI Galil – 10,000
 IMI Micro Galil
 IMI Micro Galil
 IMI MAR Galil
 IMI SAR Galil
 IMI ARM Galil
 IMI AR Galil
 T65
 M16A1 & M16A2 rifle – 6,000
 SIG SG 540
 Ithaca 37
 Remington-870 shotgun
 M67 grenade
 M59 grenade
 M34 grenade
 M26A1 grenade
 AN M14
 AN M18
 M79 grenade launcher – 64
 Heckler & Koch HK69A1 / MZP-1
 FAMAE SAF – Standard and mini-versions
 HK MP5 sub-machine guns
 RPK
 RPKS (folding stock)
RPKS-74M
RPKS-74
RPKS-74N
RPKSN
RPK-74m
RPKN
RPD
RPK(S)N night scope rail
RPK(S)Lflash suppressor& night scope rail
RPKM (modernized)
RPK-203 (export variant)
RPK-204 (7.62×51mm NATO)
AGS-17 Plamya
AGS-30 Atlant light automatic grenade launcher

Armoured vehicles

 T-72 – MBT – 20 T-72Bs delivered 2016
 T-54/55 – 62 – 156 delivered (20 T-54 & 136 T-55) some via Bulgaria & Libya
 PT-76B LT – 22
 BMP-1 – IFV – some
 AMX-VCI – APC – 30 – (planning modernisation)
 BTR-152 – APC – 120
 BTR-40 – APC – 20
 BTR-50U CP Version- 1
 BTR-60PB 8x8 APC – 82
 BRDM-2 – 4 – modernised
 T17E1 Staghound 4x4 37mm ARV via – 20

Vehicles

 Land Rover Defender
 Caterpillar Inc. wheeled bulldozers
 Dodge M37
 M35A2 2½ ton cargo truck
 Willys M38A – 1 MD
 AIL M325 Command Car
 Toyota Land Cruiser
 Pegaso – 3045
 Unimog – 406
 Tatra trucks
 Ural trucks
 Santana 88 Ligero Militar
 Tiuna
 Humvee

Anti-tank weapons

AT-3 Sagger  9K-11 Malyutka anti tank missiles-500
BGM-71C TOW-some
B-11 107mm RCL
M40A1C1 106mm RCL
M67 90mm RCL
B-10 82mm RCL
M20 75mm RCL
M18 57mm RCL

Artillery

 D-30 2A18 122mm towed howitzer – 67
 M-30 122mm towed howitzer – 24
 D-20 M-1955 152mm towed howitzer – 60
 ZiS-2 M-1943 57mm anti tank gun – 354
 M101A 105mm towed howitzer – 12
 ZiS-3 M-1942 76mm divisional gun – 85
 BS-3 100mm filed gun – 24
 M-160 160mm heavy mortar – 4
 M-43 120mm heavy mortar – 24
 Soltam M-65 120mm heavy mortar – some
	
Multiple rocket launchers
	
 BM-21 Grad-1P – 100
 Type 63 – 33
 BM-21 – 30

Anti-aircraft equipment 

 ZSU-23-4 Shilka \ Gundish – 44 sold to Ecuador
 ZSU-57-2 – 10
 FIM-92 Stinger
 FIM-43 Redeye
 ZU-23-2 – 20
 SA-7B 9K32 Strela 2 Grail – 1,600
 SA-14 9K34 Strela 3 Gremlin – 117
 SA-16 9K38 Igla Gimlet TOTAL: – 360 MANPAD launchers.
 9K31 Strela-1 – SA-9 Gaskin
 SA-8 9K33 Osa – 8 launchers \ 60 missiles via Libya
 KS-19 100mm AAGs – 18
 Hispano-Suiza HS404\TCM-20 2x20mm AAGs
 M45 Quadmount 4x12,7mm Browning M-2HB
 ZPU – 1\2\4
 S-60 57mm AAGs – 24

EW radars

 P-37 Bar-Lock – 2
 P-12 Spoon-Rest – 6
 Son-9 – 7

Personnel

Military careers 
The Nicaraguan military, Fuerzas Armadas de Nicaragua, exists in a top-down hierarchy and is partitioned into multiple ranks. In order to become a Lieutenant, Captain, Major, Lieutenant Colonel or Colonel, a candidate must attend Staff College (ESEM). Alternatively, one may begin a military career as a Lieutenant, with the opportunity for advancement, by obtaining a bachelor's degree in Military Sciences. Individuals may also attend Officers School, to gain the rank of Major, Lieutenant Colonel, Colonel, and General Staff or Army General.

The Nicaraguan navy offers training other than that offered through ESEM, a bachelor's degree in Military Sciences, and Officers School. Candidates seeking to advance in the Nicaraguan navy may attend navy-specific training to become Lieutenant Commanders, Commanders, Captains, fleet Admirals, Generals, Major Generals and Generals of the Army.

Despite offering advancement through ESEM training, Officers School, and a bachelor's degree in Military Sciences, most high-ranking officers choose to receive their formal military education from training opportunities in Mexico, Spain, France, China, Russia, and Cuba.

Military size (manpower) 
Nicaragua has a small military force with only 9,412 members as of 2010. This number includes 1,500 officers (16%), 302 non-commissioned officers (3%), and 7,610 troops (81%). This relatively small armed force is supported by an extremely small $41 million-dollar defense budget (2010). Such a small military budget has resulted in severe deficiencies in terms of manpower (i.e. cannot supply and employ) and modern weaponry. This budget represents approximately 2.84% of the country's overall expenditures.

Civilian police 
The National Police of Nicaragua, established in 1979, was created to maintain domestic tranquility, prevent crime, ensure security for all civilians, prosecute offenders, and enforce any other nationally mandated laws. As a non-political, non-partisan, and non-deliberative organization, the National Police of Nicaragua was a revolutionary agency when created. This body is unaided by the national military, since it exists as a completely separate entity; however, in accordance with Article 92, the President may order the army to intervene on the National Police's behalf. There is also a volunteer police force that aids the National Police force, not just in times of dire need. The National Police Force is organized into several different tiers: the national specialized organizations (i.e. investigation departments), support organizations (i.e. Police Academy), police delegations (i.e. department, municipal), and advisory structures (i.e. National Council). Those wishing to become members of the National Police Force must pass through rigorous hours of training and multiple examinations.

References

Works cited

External links 

Official site 

Military of Nicaragua